Patient navigators educate and assist United States citizens in enrolling into health benefit plans stipulated in the Patient Protection and Affordable Care Act (ACA).  Patient navigators are also called "insurance navigators" or "in-person assisters" who have defined roles under the ACA. Although their roles might overlap, patient navigators are not community health workers or health advocates. "Navigators" work in states with Federally-Facilitated Exchanges (FFEs) or State Partnership Exchanges.

Under the ACA, a health insurance marketplace, or exchange, is required to develop and fund a patient navigator program. The patient navigator's primary role, as defined in section 1311, is to educate the public on information about health care plans, to facilitate enrollment into health plans, and provide information for tax credits and cost-sharing reductions. The education and information provided by patient navigators must be culturally and linguistically appropriate and provided in a fair and impartial manner. Patient navigators are required to meet standards and core proficiencies established by the Secretary of Health and Human Services.

Standardization and Qualifications

Conflict-of-Interest Rules 
Prior to certification and training, the Centers for Medicare and Medicaid Services (CMS) require that all navigator and non-navigator individuals or entities seeking to facilitate public enrollment in plans disclose information that may result in a conflict of interest to exchanges and consumers.
This information includes:
 Lines of insurance that a navigator intends to sell;
 Existing or former employment relationships within 5 years with an issuer of health or Stop loss policy (insurance);
 Existing employment relationship between an individual's spouse or domestic partner and any issuer of health or stop-loss insurance; and,
 Existing or anticipated financial, business or contractual relationships with any issuer of health or stop-loss insurance.

If a navigator or non-navigator does have a conflict of interest while serving in their respective roles, they are to provide a plan for mitigating these conflicts. Failure to submit a mitigation plan will result in the inability to serve as a navigator and promote ACA health plan benefits.

Certification and Training Requirements 
The ACA requires that all navigator and non-navigator personnel and entities be certified by the Federally-Facilitated Exchange or State Partnership Exchange through which they are funded.  Certification is provided upon completion of a training program approved by the U.S. Department of Health and Human Services (HHS).

Certification Requirements 
Navigators and non-navigators must first register with their exchange prior to completing a training program and qualifying for certification. Certification entails:
 Completing up to 30 hours of training,
 Passing an HHS-approved certification test, and
 Having the ability to provide culturally and linguistically appropriate services (CLAS standards) to individual and small business exchanges.
Continuing education and refresher trainings are also required to ensure that navigators and non-navigators remain appropriately trained and comply with their recertification requirements on at least an annual basis.

Navigator and Non-navigator Training 
Training programs for navigators and non-navigators must be approved by the U.S. Department of Health and Human Services (HHS).  The Medicare Learning Network is the primary source of HHS-approved training materials. Other approved programs include the:
 Harold P. Freeman Patient Navigator Institute,
 Patient Navigator Training Collaborative, and
 Sonoma State University Patient Navigator Certificate Program.

State Exchanges may develop their own training programs, but they must also be approved by HHS. Training standards outlined by the Centers for Medicare and Medicaid Services include:
 Working with vulnerable and underserved populations
 Culturally and linguistically appropriate services (CLAS standards)
 Ensuring services are accessible to people with disabilities
 Insurance affordability programs such as Medicaid, CHIP and other public programs
 Eligibility and enrollment rules and process
 Qualified health plans
 Differences between health plans
 Privacy, security, and customer service standards
 Outreach and education methods and strategies

Table 1.  Summary of Training and Certification Required

New York State Health Home Model 
The Affordable Care Act of 2010, Section 2703, created an optional Medicaid State Plan benefit for states to establish Health Homes to coordinate care for people with Medicaid who have chronic conditions by adding Section 1945 of the Social Security Act. CMS expects states health home providers to operate under a “whole-person” philosophy. Health Home providers will integrate and coordinate all primary, acute, behavioral health, and long-term services and supports to treat the whole person.

What is a “Health Home”? 
A Health Home is a group of health and community agencies that have agreed to work together to help people with many health issues get what they need to keep them healthier and safer in the community. Each person who joins gets a “patient health navigator”. A patient health navigator will work closely with him/her to get the services he/she needs in his/her community. This service is being paid for through New York State Medicaid.

The Greater Buffalo United Accountable Healthcare Network (GBUAHN) was incorporated in 2009 by Raul Vazquez, M.D. as an Independent Physician Association (IPA) in Western New York. Many Medicaid beneficiaries suffer from multiple or severe chronic conditions and could potentially benefit from better coordination and management of the health and long-term services they receive, often in a costly disjointed and fragmented manner. The GBUAHN has adopted a strategy to achieve a more effective and efficient way to coordinate services to Medicaid participants. GBUAHN is a Lead Health Home with over 140 physician members located in Buffalo, Erie and other Western New York counties.

The GBUAHN is designed to be a person-centered system of care that facilitates access to and coordination of the full array of primary and acute physical health services, behavioral health care, and long-term community-based services and supports. Our Health Home model of service delivery expands on the traditional medical home models by building additional linkages and enhancing coordination and integration of medical and behavioral health care to meet the needs of people with multiple chronic illnesses. We emphasize comprehensive care in one setting, and we have the technology to diagnose a wide variety of medical conditions.

The goal of GBUAHN is to improve health care quality and clinical outcomes as well as the patient care experience, while also reducing per capita costs through more cost-effective care.

NCQA Accreditation 
GBUAHN was the first health home in the nation to receive NCQA accreditation in Case Management. Case management programs must prove they identify people in need of services, develop personalized care plans, monitor care goals to make adjustments when needed and manage communication among providers as people move between care settings. 

NCQA's mission is to improve health care for all Americans.

Funding Navigator or Non-navigator Programs 
Section 1311(i) of the Affordable Care Act requires that each exchange develop a grant program to fund Navigators, organizations or individuals who facilitate education and enrollment in qualified health plans. Exchanges and their grant programs must meet a minimum set of standards. There are two primary sources of funding for in-person outreach, education, and assistance for enrolling in exchange health plans.

Navigator Funding for Federally-Facilitated Exchanges (FFEs) and State Partnership Exchanges 
In April 2013, the Centers for Medicare and Medicaid Services (CMS) announced a cooperative agreement to support navigators in Federally-Facilitated Exchanges or State-Partnership Exchanges. Up to $54 million from Prevention and Public Health Funds (PPHF) were initially set aside for funding navigators in all 34 states. Apportionment of funds were calculated based on the number of uninsured and non-elderly legal residents living in each state (with an FFE or State Partnership Exchange) divided by the total number of uninsured, non-elderly residents in all states with FFEs/State Partnership Exchanges. A minimum of $600,000 was available to all FFEs or State Partnership Exchanges to support navigation programs.

Applicants eligible for this funding included entities, individuals, and consortia (any combination of two or more individuals, public organizations, or private organizations). Each applicant was eligible for one, non-renewable cooperative agreement award. Grant applications were reviewed based on the ranking of the application, scope of proposed activities, and total number and type of applications funded within each state. Each exchange must also have at least two different types of entities serve as navigators, "one of which must be a community and consumer-focused non-profit group." (Affordable Care Act Section 1311(i), 45 C.F.R. § 155.210)

Funded Navigator Programs 
On August 15, 2013, HHS announced $67 million in grants to 105 groups that applied to provide navigation in Federally-Facilitated Exchanges and State Partnership Exchanges. An additional $13 million were transferred from the Prevention and Public Health Funds to boost the original $54 million dedicated to navigator funding earlier in the year. Navigator grantees included but were not limited to healthcare organizations and networks, non-profit organizations, universities, Indian tribes, faith-based institutions, and food banks.

Largest navigator grants:
 United Way of Metropolitan Tarrant County, Texas, $5,889,181
 University of South Florida, 64 of 67 counties in Florida, $4,213,696
 Structured Employment Economic Development Corporation (SEEDCO), Georgia, $2,159,360
 Ohio Association of Foodbanks, $2,014,750
 North Carolina Community Care Networks, $1,988,428
 Michigan Consumers for Healthcare, $1,319,345

A complete list of navigator grant recipients can be found here.

Non-Navigator Funding for State Exchanges 
State Exchanges are prohibited from using section 1311(a) grant funds to fund navigator programs. However, State Exchanges and state partners in Consumer Partnership Exchanges can use section 1311(a) Exchange Establishment grants to fund non-navigator assistance programs such as in-person assistance programs. These non-navigator assistance programs "help ensure that the Exchange is providing outreach, education, and assistance to as broad a range of consumers as possible so that all consumers can receive help when accessing health insurance coverage through an Exchange."

Potential Funding Issues 
A September 2013 Congressional Research Service report notes two key issues related to navigator and non-navigator funding.
 Some lawmakers question Health and Human Services' authority to transfer Prevention and Public Health Funds to provide navigator grants.
 State Exchanges' ability to use Exchange Establishment grants to provide non-navigator outreach and education potentially creates large disparities in funding assistance by state. For example, Covered California, California's exchange, awarded $37 million in grants for in-person assistance. In contrast, Texas' FFE received $10.8 million in grants from CMS.

Implementation of Navigator Programs 
Many conservative states and members of Congress are demanding more oversight of patient navigator programs to protect consumers and their privacy. Others claim that passing laws to regulate navigators is an effort to hinder the implementation of the ACA. At least 16 states have enacted their own licensing and certification requirements in addition to federal requirements, which some suggest will reduce the availability of patient navigators. Some legislatures have also passed laws restricting the navigator's role, which can prevent navigators from performing some of their expected duties. States have passed various laws requiring navigator licenses, certifications, restrictions on offering advice, and burdensome financial requirements. As of September 2013, twelve states have required either a state license or certification, and eight states have restricted the type of advice navigators are able to offer to consumers.

In Texas, navigators are required to undergo a background check and fingerprinting, provide proof of identity, and 20 hours of state-specific training in addition to the 20 hours of online training required by federal rules. One navigator group estimated that the additional training could cost an additional $400 per navigator. Texas is among at least 17 Republican-controlled states that have restricted navigator groups awarded federal grants to assist consumers in obtaining insurance coverage in the Exchanges.
In Georgia, navigators must fulfill state licensure requirements and pass an insurance broker's test, despite clear distinctions between brokers and navigators under federal law. Unlike brokers and agents, navigators cannot receive compensation from insurance companies and are prohibited from promoting a specific insurance plan.

Ohio, Missouri, Georgia, and Tennessee have passed laws preventing navigators from offering information about the features of a specific health plan. These laws prevent navigators from clarifying distinctions between plans in order to help consumers make informed decisions on obtaining appropriate coverage.

Utah, Wisconsin, Iowa, and Illinois require that navigators hold insurance or a surety bond against claims of wrongdoing or mistake. Federal regulations bar states from demanding navigators to maintain omissions or errors coverage.

On Jan 23, 2014, a federal judge ruled on a Missouri case saying that states that have Federally-Facilitated Exchanges cannot enact state regulations on top of the federal regulations.

References 

Affordable Care Act
Healthcare in the United States